Perryville is a small hamlet in Madison County, New York, in the United States. The only remaining public building is the Methodist church.

Perryville Falls is located nearby.

References

Hamlets in New York (state)
Hamlets in Madison County, New York